Mékinac may refer to:

 Mékinac Regional County Municipality, Quebec
 Saint-Roch-de-Mékinac, Quebec, a parish municipality
 Saint-Joseph-de-Mékinac, Quebec, a former municipality in the administrative region of Mauricie, Quebec, whose territory was merged with the municipality of Trois-Rives
 Mékinac River, a tributary of the Saint-Maurice River in Quebec
 North Mékinac River, a tributary of Rivière des Envies, in Mauricie, Quebec
 South Mékinac River, a tributary of North Mékinac River, in Mauricie, Quebec
 Mékinac Lake, in the administrative region of Mauricie, Quebec
 Mékinac Dam, Québec
 Mékinac (township)

See also 
 Mackinac (disambiguation)
 Michilimackinac, a historic term for the entire region around the Straits of Mackinac
 Fort Michilimackinac, a fort on the south side of the straits